Karamabad (also Romanized as Karamābād; also known as Karamābād-e Dargāvand) is a village in Mirbag-e Shomali Rural District, in the Central District of Delfan County, Lorestan Province, Iran. At the 2006 census, its population was 36, in 8 families.

References 

Towns and villages in Delfan County